In Round 1, all eight teams play against each other. A total of 28 matches will be played in this round.

League table

Matches

Round 1 statistics

Scorers

Assists

Hat-tricks

 4 Player scored 4 goals

Clean sheets
Clean sheets by Club:
New Radiant SC (5)
Vyansa (3)
Victory SC (2)
Club Valencia (2)
Club Eagles (2)
VB Addu FC (1)
Club All Youth Linkage (0)
Clean sheets by goalkeepers:
Imran Mohamed (New Radiant SC) (4)
Alexander Osei Domfeh (Vyansa) (3)
Lavent Vanli (Victory SC) (2)
Ibrahim Ifrah Areef (Club Valencia) (2)
Mohamed Yamaan (Club Eagles) (2)
Abdulla Fayaz (New Radiant SC) (2)
Mohamed Imran (Maziya S&RC) (1)
Mohamed Shinan (VB Addu FC) (1)
Athif Ahmed (Maziya S&RC) (0)
Hussain Habeeb (VB Addu FC) (0)
Ibrahim Siyad (Club All Youth Linkage) (0)
Abdulla Ziyazan (VB Addu FC) (0)

References

1